Señorita Panamá 1993, the 11th Señorita Panamá pageant, was held in Teatro Anayansi Centro de Convenciones Atlapa, Panama city, Panama, September 1993, after weeks of events. The winner of the pageant was María Sofía Velásquez.

The pageant was broadcast live on RPC Panamá. About 15 contestants from all over Panamá competed for the prestigious crown. At the conclusion of the final night of competition, outgoing titleholder Giselle González crowned María Sofía Velásquez Jaimes-Freyre as the new Señorita Panamá.

Velásquez compete in the 43rd edition of the Miss Universe 1994 pageant, was held Plenary Hall of the Philippine International Convention Center, in Manila, Philippines on May 20, 1994.

Final result

Contestants 
These are the competitors who have been selected this year.

Election schedule
Thursday September Final night, coronation Señorita Panamá 1993

Candidates Notes
María Sofía Velásquez born in Argentina.

Historical significance
Panama Central won Señorita Panamá.

References

External links
  Señorita Panamá official website
 

Señorita Panamá
1993 beauty pageants